Buras is a census-designated place (CDP) in Plaquemines Parish, Louisiana, United States. Its population was 945 at the 2010 census, and 1,109 in 2020. Prior to the 2010 census, Buras was considered to be part of the Buras-Triumph CDP.

History

In November 2006, Jeré Longman of The New York Times wrote that "almost no evidence of recovery exist[ed]" in the post-Hurricane Katrina period. In December 2007, Longman reported that there was still "little sign of recovery" in Buras. The town was founded in the 1840s; 20 years later, it was the site of Civil War battles at Forts Jackson and St. Philip. Today, the Buras area is known for hauling in much of the state's oysters.

Demographics

In the pre-Katrina period (before August 29, 2005) Buras had about 30-40 Cambodian shrimpers, presenting the area's large Asian American population. In the post-Hurricane period (after August 29, 2005) Brenda Kap, quoted in The New York Times, stated most of them had returned. At the 2020 United States census, its Asian population was 348, making them the second-largest racial and ethnic group in the CDP; non-Hispanic and Latino whites made up 475 persons total, and Black and African Americans were the third largest group.

Education
Plaquemines Parish School Board operates the public schools of the parish.

It is served by South Plaquemines High School in Buras.

Prior to 2005 Buras Middle School (grades 6–8) and Buras High School (grades PK-5 and 9–12) served the community, but Hurricane Katrina damaged the buildings. In the immediate post-Katrina period no new campuses opened in Buras, leading some residents to feel that the community may further erode. The permanent school building of South Plaquemines High was established on the site of the former Buras Middle School, while faculty residences were placed on the property of the former Buras High School.

Plaquemines Parish is in the service area of Nunez Community College.

References

Unincorporated communities in Plaquemines Parish, Louisiana
Unincorporated communities in Louisiana
Census-designated places in Plaquemines Parish, Louisiana
Census-designated places in Louisiana
Louisiana populated places on the Mississippi River
Census-designated places in New Orleans metropolitan area